Gymnoscelis prouti is a moth in the family Geometridae. It is found on Borneo, Sumatra, Peninsular Malaysia and the north-eastern Himalayas. The habitat consists of upper montane areas.

References

Moths described in 1997
prouti